Sannina uroceriformis, the persimmon borer, is a moth of the family Sesiidae. It is found along the Atlantic coast of the United States, from New Jersey to Florida and westward to Texas, Oklahoma, Missouri, Kansas, Ohio and Indiana.

The wingspan is 28–32 mm, with the female being slightly larger than male. Adults are bluish black and wasplike. Typically, there is a distinctive orange band across the abdomen, though it is lacking in some. The blue-black color and orange abdominal band cause it to be confused with the female of the more common peachtree borer at times. Adults emerge from April to early July in the Gulf Coast region and mostly in June and July in the northern range.

The larvae feed on persimmon. Native wild persimmon is preferred; introduced Japanese persimmons grafted onto the native persimmon rootstocks are sometimes attacked. Improved varieties are probably susceptible.

On hatching, larvae move to suitable sites, usually at or near the root collar, to bore into the bark, but attacks sometimes are initiated 30 to 60 cm above ground. Young larvae begin feeding and mine downward in the cambium. Mines occasionally meander but usually extend essentially straight down. At or slightly below the groundline, larvae extend tunnels into the wood, sometimes to the center of both the lateral and tap roots. Root galleries most commonly extend down to a depth of 20 to 25 cm, but can reach 43 to 56 cm in the taproots. Larvae overwinter in their galleries below the soil line and pupate during spring. When ready to pupate larvae extend their galleries upward in the roots to groundline or just above. They chew through the bark and construct large cocoons upward and outward from the bark. These tubelike cases are made of dark frass, bits of bark, and silk. Pupation occurs in the galleries. In about three weeks, the pupae become active and work their way up through the tubelike cocoons to project through the covers for adult emergence.

References

External links
mothphotographersgroup

Sesiidae
Moths described in 1856
Persimmon